Xenosaurus is a genus of lizards. Xenosaurus is the only extant genus in the family Xenosauridae with 13 species currently recognized. Also known as the  Middle American knob-scaled lizards found in southwestern Tamaulipas and eastern Guerrero on the Atlantic and Pacific versants of Mexico, respectively, south and east to Alta Verapaz, Guatemala. They can be found between 300 m and 2360 m of elevation in a wide variety of habitats ranging from xerophytic tropical scrub to cloud forest to tropical rain forest. Where they occupy moderately diverse places, including crevices and holes in limestone, spaces under volcanic boulders, crevices in volcanic rocks, karst limestone, limestone terrain, and hollow logs in dry areas where trees are sparse. A flattened body shape and a crevice-dwelling ecology generally characterize species in the group. In part because of their habitat specialization, all of the known species and subspecies are allopatric, and several have small geographic distributions. Dorsal scales are heteromorphic, not imbrication, and some are conical or developed into enlarged tubercles separated by small granular scales. Ventral scales are flat, quadrate, and arranged in transverse rows. Head scales are generally small, tuberculate, and sometimes conical or rugose, but may be enlarged along the rostra and temporal ridges. Supraoculars also are enlarged, flattened, and in a single longitudinal row. The skin of the neck is loose and expanded, producing at least two angular fold. These lizards are known to feed on a variety of crawling and flying insects. This genus mostly eats orthopterans, coleopterans (beetles), dipterans, and myriapods.

Species
The following 13 species are recognized as being valid.

Xenosaurus agrenon 
Xenosaurus arboreus 
Xenosaurus fractus 
Xenosaurus grandis 
Xenosaurus manipulus 
Xenosaurus mendozai 
Xenosaurus newmanorum 
Xenosaurus penai 
Xenosaurus phalaroanthereon 
Xenosaurus platyceps 
Xenosaurus rackhami 
Xenosaurus rectocollaris 
Xenosaurus tzacualtipantecus 

Nota bene: A binomial authority in parentheses indicates that the species was originally described in a genus other than Xenosaurus.

References

Further reading
Peters W (1861). "Eine neue Gattung von Eidechsen, Xenosaurus fasciatus, aus Mexico [= A new genus of lizards, Xenosaurus fasciatus, from Mexico]". Monatsberichte der Königlichen Preussischen Akademie zu Berlin 1861: 453–454. (Xenosaurus, new genus). (in German).

External links

Xenosauridae
Taxa named by Wilhelm Peters
Lizard genera